= Rocky Ridge Formation =

Volcanic formation in Newfoundland

- Stratigraphic range: Early Devonian – Late Devonian
- Type: Formation

Lithology
- Primary: Felsic volcanics

Location
- Region: Newfoundland
- Country: Canada
- Occurrence of the Rocky Ridge Formation in southeastern Newfoundland

The Rocky Ridge Formation is a volcanic formation cropping out in Newfoundland.
